Nazar Kandi (also Romanized as Naz̧ar Kandī) is a village in Nowjeh Mehr Rural District, Siah Rud District, Jolfa County, East Azerbaijan Province, Iran. At the 2006 census, its population was 111, in 28 families.

References 

Populated places in Jolfa County